Pretty Lies is the second extended play from Veridia. Word Records alongside Curb Records along with Fervent Records released the EP on September 25, 2015.

Critical reception

Darcy Rumble, rating the EP three and a half stars for HM Magazine, describes, "the band has taken a polished rock sound, threw in some electronica and strings influence to produce a catchy alt-rock record." Awarding the EP four and a half stars from New Release Today, Jonathan J. Francesco states, "Pretty Lies is not only a commanding encore, but a huge step forward for the band." Joshua Andre, giving the EP four and a half stars at 365 Days of Inspiring Media, writes, "there's something musically on this EP for everyone".

Track listing

Chart performance

References 

2015 EPs